"Solo (Vuelta al ruedo)" is a single by Italian singer Marco Mengoni. The song was released as the lead single from his first studio album Solo 2.0 on 1 September 2011, and it was released to mainstream radios on 2 September 2011. It was written by Marco Mengoni, Piero Calabrese, Massimo Calabrese, Stella Fabiani and Stefano Calabrese. The song peaked at number 4 on the Italian Singles Chart.

Music video
The music video for the song, directed by Gianluca "Calu" Montesano, was premiered by MSN Video on 7 September 2011. The video was uploaded to YouTube on 11 September 2011.

Track listing

Chart performance

Release history

References

2011 singles
Marco Mengoni songs
2011 songs
Songs written by Marco Mengoni